The Pennsylvania lieutenant gubernatorial election of 2010 was held on November 2, 2010. The winning candidates for Governor and Lieutenant Governor will serve a four-year term from 2011 to 2015. In Pennsylvania, the Lieutenant Governor is elected on the same ticket as the Governor, so the only campaign for this office was the primary election. As a result of Tom Corbett's election to the position of governor, Jim Cawley became the new Lieutenant Governor.

Democratic primary

Candidates
 Scott Conklin, State Representative (from Philipsburg)
 Jonathan Saidel, former Philadelphia City Controller
 Doris Smith-Ribner, former Commonwealth Court Judge (from Pittsburgh)

Results

As a result of the Democratic primary, Scott Conklin served as the running mate to Democratic gubernatorial candidate Dan Onorato.

Republican primary

Candidates
 Jim Cawley, Bucks County Commissioner (from Middletown Township)
 Chet Beiler, manufacturing executive and 2008 Republican nominee for Auditor General (from Penn Township, Lancaster County)
 Russ Diamond, director of PACleanSweep (from Annville Township)
 Steve Johnson, home inspection executive (from York)
 John Kennedy, former State Representative (from Camp Hill)
 Billy McCue, business manager for a Roman Catholic church (from Carroll Township, Washington County)
 Daryl Metcalfe, State Representative (from Cranberry Township, Butler County)
 Jean Craige Pepper, financial executive and 2004 Republican nominee for Pennsylvania State Treasurer (from Millcreek Township, Erie County)
 Stephen Urban, Luzerne County Commissioner (from Wilkes-Barre)

Withdrew
Carol Aichele, (from Tredyffrin Township, Chester County)

Results

As a result of the Republican primary, Jim Cawley served as the running mate to Republican gubernatorial candidate Tom Corbett.

See also
2010 Pennsylvania gubernatorial election
2010 United States Senate election in Pennsylvania

References

Lieutenant Gubernatorial
Pennsylvania
2010